Ravenswood is a neighborhood located on the North Side of the city of Chicago, Illinois.  Lacking designation as one of Chicago's 77 well-defined community areas, it is mostly situated in the Lincoln Square community area, with the portion east of Ravenswood Avenue and the Chicago & Northwestern/Union Pacific North Line railroad tracks being situated in the Uptown community area.

Ravenswood was founded in 1868 as an exclusive commuter suburb by a group of real-estate speculators. These speculators formed the Ravenswood Land Company and purchased 194 acres of farmland and woods eight miles north of Chicago. The woods supported a population of ravens. Ravenswood is known for its courtyard-style residential buildings. Once considered an "up and coming" neighborhood, Ravenswood has seen its real estate values skyrocket since the 1990s.

Arts and cultural sites
 Lillstreet Art Center

Education
Residents in Ravenswood are zoned to the campuses of the Chicago Public Schools:
 Ravenswood Elementary School (PK-8)
 Ravenswood Elementary was established in 1873 as Sulzer Street School; Sulzer Street was later renamed Montrose Avenue. The school adopted its current name in 1893, when 12 classrooms were added to the building. In 1912 and 1913 wings on the north and south sides of the building, consisting of 12 rooms, were built. The school received additional land in 1923; this land was acquired by CPS in 1910. From 1912 to a period in the 1930s, junior high school level students attended classes at Stockton School instead of Ravenswood School, and in turn first year students (freshmen) from Lake View High School, which was overcrowded, attended classes at the Ravenswood building.  Ravenswood Elementary has 500 students.
 Mc Pherson Elementary School (K - 8)
 Those west of Ashland are zoned to Amundsen High School while others are zoned to Senn High School

References

External links

Ravenswood Elementary School

Neighborhoods in Chicago
Populated places established in 1868